The Anglican Diocese of Cape Coast  is a diocese of the Church of the Province of West Africa, a member church of the worldwide Anglican Communion. It is the oldest area of Anglican missionary activity in Ghana. This diocese was created out of the then Accra Diocese in 1981. It has had four Diocesan Bishops till date. They are the Rt Rev John Alexander Ackon, Rt Rev Eduah Quarshie, Rt Rev Daniel Sylvanus Adotei Allotey and the current Diocesan, Rt Rev Victor Reginald Atta-Baffoe. She is divided into 4 Archdeaconries namely - Winneba, Saltpond, Cape Coast and Fosu as well as the Cathedral Deanery. In 2014, the Diocese of Dunkwa-on-Offin was carved out of the Diocese of Cape Coast making it one of two in the Central Region of Ghana. She has an active church membership of around 10,000 worshipping in 33 Parishes and their outstations. She also has about 35 active duty clergy including two female deacons.  In 2020 the Anglican Diocese of Cape Coast ordained its first female deacon, the Rev Mrs Vida Gyabeng Frimpong.

Its partner diocese is the Diocese of Chichester. The current bishop is Victor Atta-Baffoe.

Education
The role of the Diocese in the development of education in the Central Region cannot be over emphasized. There are 54 Day Nurseries, 62 Primary Schools and 74 Junior Secondary Schools under the administration of the Anglican Educational Unit. There are two Senior High Schools in the Diocese. These include the world-famous boys boarding Senior High School, Adisadel College. The other Senior High School is the mixed Christ the King Academy. The Church of the Province of West Africa's Provincial Seminary, St Nicholas Seminary is located in Cape Coast in the Diocese. She also has the oldest school in Ghana. The Philip Quaque Boys School founded by the now canonised Rev Philip Quaque, an SPG missionary of local origins, in the 18th century.<ref> [Anglican Story in Ghana, Pobee]

Healthcare
With regard to the provision of health care the Diocese has two medical facilities: a health clinic at Dominase in the Upper Denkyira District and an Eye Clinic, the Bishop Ackon Memorial Christian Eye Centre in Cape Coast.

References

Anglican dioceses in Ghana
Dioceses of the Church of the Province of West Africa
Dioceses in Ghana
Anglican bishops of Cape Coast